Genthin is a town in Jerichower Land district, in Saxony-Anhalt, Germany.

Geography

The municipal area consists of Genthin proper and the following Ortschaften or municipal divisions:

Fienerode
Gladau
Mützel
Paplitz
Parchen
Schopsdorf
Tucheim

The formerly independent municipalities Gladau, Paplitz and Tucheim were incorporated in July 2009, followed by Schopsdorf in July 2012.

Genthin was the administrative seat of the Verwaltungsgemeinschaft ("collective municipality") Elbe-Stremme-Fiener until its merger into the newly established Jerichow municipality in 2010.

History
Genthin Castle was first mentioned in an 1144 deed, it was the residence of the Plotho noble family who then served as ministeriales of the Archbishops of Magdeburg. The surrounding settlement was documented as a town in 1459, its citizens were vested with market rights in 1539.

When the last administrator of the Magdeburg archbishopric, Duke Augustus of Saxe-Weissenfels, died in 1680, Genthin with the Duchy of Magdeburg fell to the Electors of Brandenburg. The Baroque Trinity parish church was erected from 1707 to 1722. 

The town's economy was decisively promoted by the building of the Elbe–Havel Canal from 1743 onwards and the opening of the Berlin–Magdeburg railway line in 1846. A detergent factory was opened in 1921 by Henkel.

On the night of 21–22 December 1939, at least 186 (according to other sources: 278) people were killed in a train crash at Genthin station, making it one of the most deadliest railway accidents in Germany. A monument to the victims was erected in the town. In 1943 a subcamp of Ravensbrück concentration camp was built in Genthin for about 1,000 female prisoners and forced labourers. After World War II, Genthin was part of the Soviet occupation zone.

Mayor
Thomas Barz was elected mayor in 2013.

Economy
The headquarters of the LFD Holding are in Genthin.

Twin towns

Genthin is twinned with:
 Datteln, Germany, since 1990
 Radlin, Poland, since 2008

Notable people
 Herms Niel (Hermann Nielebock) (1888-1954), conductor and composer
Kurt von Manteuffell (1853-1922), Prussian General of the Infantry
Walter Model (1891–1945), field marshal in WW II
Norbert Dürpisch (born 1952), cyclist
Bernd Dittert (born 1961), racing cyclist, Olympic champion and trainer

References

Jerichower Land